The Englishwoman's Review was a feminist periodical published in England between 1866 and 1910.

Until 1869 called in full The Englishwoman's Review: a journal of woman's work, in 1870 (after a break in publication) it was renamed The Englishwoman's Review of Social and Industrial Questions.

One of the first feminist journals, The Englishwoman's Review was a product of the early women's movement. Its first editor was Jessie Boucherett, who saw it as the successor to the English Woman's Journal (1858–64). Subsequent editors were Caroline Ashurst Biggs, Helen Blackburn, and Antoinette Mackenzie.

Contributors
Notable contributors include:

Amelia Sarah Levetus
Mary Lowndes
Lady Margaret Sackville
Ethel Rolt Wheeler

Notes

External links
 The Englishwoman's Review of Social and Industrial Questions, London 1876

1866 establishments in England
1910 disestablishments in England
Defunct literary magazines published in the United Kingdom
Defunct women's magazines published in the United Kingdom
Feminism in England
Feminist magazines
Independent magazines
Magazines established in 1866
Magazines disestablished in 1910
Monthly magazines published in the United Kingdom